Hélène Daneault (born 29 May 1961) is a Canadian politician. She was a Coalition Avenir Québec member of the National Assembly of Quebec for the riding of Groulx from 2012 to 2014, first elected in the 2012 election.

Prior to her election to the legislature, she served as mayor of Rosemère.

References

External links
 

Living people
1961 births
Coalition Avenir Québec MNAs
Women MNAs in Quebec
People from Salaberry-de-Valleyfield
Université de Sherbrooke alumni
Canadian women physicians
Canadian general practitioners
20th-century Canadian physicians
21st-century Canadian physicians
21st-century Canadian politicians
21st-century Canadian women politicians
Mayors of places in Quebec
Women mayors of places in Quebec
20th-century women physicians
21st-century women physicians
20th-century Canadian women politicians